The Jugtown Historic District consists of a cluster of historic buildings surrounding the intersection of Harrison and Nassau Street in Princeton, New Jersey.  The settlement dates to colonial times and is sometimes known as Queenston.  It was home to the short-lived Evelyn College for Women from 1887–1897.

See also
National Register of Historic Places listings in Mercer County, New Jersey

References

Historic districts in Princeton, New Jersey
National Register of Historic Places in Mercer County, New Jersey
Historic districts on the National Register of Historic Places in New Jersey
New Jersey Register of Historic Places